is a railway station on the Sanin Main Line in Yasugi, Shimane Prefecture, Japan, operated by West Japan Railway Company (JR West).

Lines
Yasugi Station is served by the Sanin Main Line.

Station layout
The station has a "Midori no Madoguchi" staffed ticket office.

Adjacent stations

History
The station opened on 5 April 1908, serving the town of Yasugi. With the privatization of Japanese National Railways (JNR) on 1 April 1987, the station came under the control of JR West.

See also
 List of railway stations in Japan

References

External links

  

Stations of West Japan Railway Company
Railway stations in Japan opened in 1908
Railway stations in Shimane Prefecture
Sanin Main Line